Monte Nudo is a mountain of Lombardy, Italy. It has an elevation of 1,237 metres. Administratively it belongs to the province of Varese.

Etymology 
In Italian Nudo means Naked; this comes from the lack of trees which characterized the mountain until the 1970s.

SOIUSA classification 
According to the SOIUSA (International Standardized Mountain Subdivision of the Alps) the mountain can be classified in the following way:
 main part = Western Alps
 major sector = North Western Alps
 section = Lugano Prealps
 subsection = Prealpi Varesine
 supergroup = Catena Piambello-Campo dei Fiori-Nudo
 group = Gruppo del Nudo
 subgroup = Gruppo del Monte Nudo
 code = I/B-11.II-B.4.c

Notes

Mountains of the Alps
Mountains of Lombardy
One-thousanders of Italy
Lugano Prealps